The Anchor D Ranch in Guymon, Oklahoma was one of the largest cattle ranches in the No Man's Land section of the Oklahoma/Texas Panhandle area. It was created around 1878 by Ezra Dudley, an investor from Newton, Massachusetts and his son, John. The ranch was headquartered on the Beaver River, in what is now Texas County, Oklahoma. After buying his first herd of cattle in south Texas, he hired experienced cowboys to drive them to the ranch. He continued to add more cattle, until he eventually he was feeding around thirty thousand cattle on an estimated .

After 1890, political pressure from the public for more homesteads in the Panhandle, combined with an economic downturn in 1893, convinced Dudley that he should liquidate his cattle empire.  Dudley sold his ranch to T. C. Schumaker and moved back to Massachusetts.

Schumaker continued to expand the Anchor D by purchasing several nearby smaller ranches, but experienced financial problems by the turn of the 20th century. Another investor, Howard M. Stonebraker, bought the Anchor D operation, as well as the brand, in 1904. Edwin Zea, a Kansas City banker, came aboard as Stonebraker's partner. The partnership was renamed the Stonebraker and Zea Cattle Company. In 1911, the state of Oklahoma chartered the Stonebraker and Zea Livestock Company, and listed John H. Lucas as a third incorporator.

The winters of 1917 and 1918 were unusually harsh, causing a large number of cattle to die. Stonebraker and Zea worked to offset these losses by reducing the scale of their operations. They subdivided the ranch by platting a substantial fraction of the land into smaller farms which they sold under the auspices of the Oklahoma and Texas Land and Loan Company. In 1939, Zea's widow sold the remaining ranch land to R. S. Coon.

In 1970, R. S. Coon Memorial Foundation sold the Anchor D land, mostly to Jack Freeman and Lewis Mayer. The Freeman Ranch added  from the sale, thereby becoming one of the state's largest ranches.

Notes

References

Further reading
 
 
 Donald E. Green (1979) Panhandle Pioneer: Henry C. Hitch, His Ranch, and His Family Oklahoma City: Oklahoma Heritage Association.

External links
 Encyclopedia of Oklahoma History and Culture - Anchor D Ranch

Ranches in Oklahoma
Buildings and structures in Texas County, Oklahoma
Pre-statehood history of Oklahoma
Oklahoma Panhandle
1878 establishments in Indian Territory